Spjald is a village in Denmark. It has a population of 1,351 (1 January 2022). Spjald is located in Ringkøbing-Skjern Municipality and therefore is part of the Central Denmark Region. The village is located between the larger towns Holstebro, Herning, Ringkøbing and Skjern. It was named "Village of the Year" by the Central Denmark Region for 2009.

Notable residents
 Jesper Juelsgård (born 1989, in Spjald) a Danish professional footballer

References

External links

 Spjald official website
 Spjald IF

Cities and towns in the Central Denmark Region
Ringkøbing-Skjern Municipality